Lithostege elegans is a species of moth in the family Geometridae. It is found in North America, where it has been recorded from Arizona.

The wingspan is about 25 mm.

References

External links 

 Coenocalpe elegans at zipcodezoo.com

Melanthiini
Moths described in 1909
Moths of North America